
The following is a list of Playboy Playmates of 1969, the 15th anniversary year of the publication.  Playboy magazine names their Playmate of the Month each month throughout the year.

January

Leslie Bianchini (born February 12, 1947) was Playboy magazine's Playmate of the Month for its January 1969 issue. Her centerfold was photographed by Mario Casilli.

In 1994, it became known that Bianchini's centerfold photo (along with Angela Dorian, Reagan Wilson, and Cynthia Myers) was scanned and inserted into Apollo 12 extra-vehicular activity astronaut cuff checklists by pranksters at NASA.

February

Lorrie Menconi (born February 24, 1948, in Philadelphia) was Playboy magazine's Playmate of the Month for its February 1969 issue. Her centerfold was photographed by William Figge and Ed DeLong.

March

Kathy MacDonald (born December 7, 1946, in New Jersey) was Playboy magazine's Playmate of the Month for its March 1969 issue. Her centerfold was photographed by David Chan.

April

Lorna Hopper (born August 31, 1950, in Houston, Texas) was Playboy magazine's Playmate of the Month for the April 1969 issue. Her centerfold was photographed by William Figge and Ed DeLong.

May

Sally Sheffield (born June 17, 1941, in Brooklyn, New York) was Playboy magazine's Playmate of the Month for the May 1969 issue. Her centerfold was photographed by Pompeo Posar.

June

Helena Antonaccio (born March 21, 1949, in Morristown, New Jersey) was Playboy magazine's Playmate of the Month for the June 1969 issue. Her centerfold was photographed by Pompeo Posar. She was also a Playboy Bunny at the New York club.

July

Nancy McNeil (born December 13, 1947, in Los Angeles) was Playboy magazine's Playmate of the Month for the July 1969 issue. Her centerfold was photographed by William Figge and Ed Delong. Nancy worked for Figge and his wife Mel for a time after she posed for them for Playboy.

August

Debbie Hooper (born January 24, 1948, in Cleveland, Ohio) was Playboy magazine's Playmate of the Month for the August 1969 issue. Her centerfold was photographed by Mario Casilli.

According to The Playmate Book, Debbie went into television commercial production following her Playboy appearance.

September

Shay Knuth (born May 29, 1945, in Milwaukee, Wisconsin) was Playboy magazine's Playmate of the Month for September 1969.  Her centerfold was photographed by Dwight Hooker. At the time of the photo shoot, she was studying sociology at the University of Wisconsin–Madison and working as a Bunny at the Playboy Resort in Lake Geneva, Wisconsin.

Knuth later appeared on the covers of the January 1970 and December 1970 issues of Playboy as well as a "Playmates Forever" pictorial in the April 1984 issue.  She also worked as a Bunny at the San Francisco and London Playboy Clubs and as the "Official Party Coordinator" for Studio 54.   Knuth lived in Chicago and was appearing at "glamour conventions".

October

Jean Bell (born Annie Lee Morgan on November 23, 1944, in St. Louis, Missouri) was one of the first of Playboy magazine's African American Playmates of the Month.

Biography
When she appeared in the October 1969 issue of Playboy, Bell was only the second African American woman to appear as the centerfold (the first was Jennifer Jackson, in March 1965).    Her centerfold was photographed by Don Klumpp. A few months later, Bell became the first black person to appear on the magazine's cover.  Bell was featured with four other playmates in the January 1970 cover of the magazine.

After Bell's appearance in Playboy, she enjoyed a brief acting career, working on such films as Mean Streets and The Klansman, sometimes credited as Jeanne Bell. She posed nude again for Playboy in the December 1979 pictorial "Playmates Forever!"

November

Claudia Jennings (born Mary Eileen Chesterton,  December 20, 1949,  Saint Paul, Minnesota — died October 3, 1979, Malibu, California) was an American model and actress.  Jennings is Playboy magazine's Playmate of the Month for November 1969 and also became Playmate of the Year for 1970. Her original pictorial was photographed by Pompeo Posar.

Jennings had been a receptionist at Playboy before posing for the magazine. After her appearances in Playboy, Jennings became an actress in 1970s "drive-in" movies and in television.  In 1973, she had a guest appearance on The Brady Bunch.

Early in the morning of October 3, 1979, Jennings died in a car accident when a van hit her while she was driving her Volkswagen Beetle convertible. She was 29 years old.

December

Gloria Root (May 28, 1948 in Chicago —  January 8, 2006 in San Francisco) was Playboy magazine's Playmate of the Month for the December 1969 issue. Her centerfold was photographed by Pompeo Posar.

Bibliography

See also
 List of people in Playboy 1960–1969

References

1969-related lists
1969
Playmates Of 1969